Cassava cake is a cassava-based dessert from the Philippines.

It can also refer to other dishes with non-English names made with cassava in various cuisines, they include:

Cakes
Bánh khoai mì, baked or steamed cakes of cassava flour and coconut milk from Vietnam
Cassava pone (or yuca cake), a type of pone from the Caribbean and Africa made using cassava and grated coconut

Pancakes
Bammy or bami, a small fried cassava flatbread from Jamaica and Belize
Casabe, roasted large cassava pancakes from Venezuela
Ereba, fried traditional pancakes of the Garifuna people in Central America

See also
Cassava-based dishes